(often abbreviated as LLSIF or Sukufesu) is a Japanese rhythm game series developed by KLab and published by Bushiroad's Bushimo for Android and iOS platforms. It was first released in Japan on April 15, 2013 (iOS) and June 8, 2013 (Android). The game is free-to-play with an in-app purchase system. It features songs and characters from the series Love Live! School Idol Project and Love Live! Sunshine!!, newly introduced girls, and stories that are not included in other media in the Love Live! franchise.

The English localization was released worldwide on May 11, 2014, for iOS and Android devices. It also was localized in China, Hong Kong, Macau, Taiwan, and South Korea. At the end of September 2016, the English version added Korean support, and the two servers merged. The Traditional Chinese version, which was operated by Mobimon in Taiwan, Hong Kong, and Macau, also merged with the English version on May 18, 2017. In February 2021 it was announced that the worldwide server would be merging with the Japanese server, which was completed in June 2021. The changes included the removal of Korean and Traditional Chinese language from the server.

On January 11, 2016, the cast of Love Live! Sunshine!! live streamed a special announcement regarding Aqours' members joining the app in July 2016. In the game, Aqours received original main and side stories, playable songs, and fully voiced cards. KLab added R rarity cards for each Aqours members on January 31, 2016, though they were only voiced after the official release in July. In June 2016, 2 Aqours members (Chika and Riko) were featured in an event for the first time. The group officially joined the game on July 5, 2016, along with a new card rarity and other major updates.

An arcade version of the game titled Love Live! School Idol Festival: After School Activity (developed and published by Square Enix) was released on December 6, 2016, in Japan, and a PlayStation 4 port was released in North America, Japan, and Southeast Asia on March 24, 2021. Another spin-off game titled Love Live! School Idol Festival All Stars was released on September 26, 2019, in Japan and February 25, 2020, worldwide. It stars the girls from Love Live! Nijigasaki High School Idol Club, with μ's and Aqours also being prominently featured within the game.

A new game, titled Love Live! School Idol Festival 2: Miracle Live! (officially abbreviated as SIF2) has been announced at the franchise's 2022 thanksgiving festival. Along with previous groups—μ's, Aqours, and Nijigasaki High School Idol Club—Liella! will also make their appearance. The global version is also under development.

Love Live! School Idol Festival is set to terminate game service on March 31, 2023.

Gameplay

The game has two gameplay modes—"Story" and "Live"— featuring all nine members of the idol groups μ's and Aqours. Players acquire a score in the rhythm "Live" mode, in which they tap circles at the proper time in order to receive a high score that can be placed on the leader board. These songs are divided into 4 difficulties: Easy, Normal, Hard, and Expert. Another difficulty called "Master" features songs that are only available for a limited time and include rhythm icons where players have to swipe their fingers on the screen during some songs.

In "Story" mode, the player works as μ's' and Aqours' helper and manage their training and schedule. The mode is full-voiced with all of the idols' respective voice actresses. The players interacts with the girls as they live their lives as school idols.

The game has several currencies:
LP: Stamina necessary for doing a Live. One song can use up to 25 LP depending on the song's difficulty. LP can be refilled by using one Love Gem, by using "Sugar Cubes" and "Sugar Pots" obtained via Special Rewards, by waiting for it to be refilled (1LP per 6 minutes), or by raising the account level or "Rank". Every 2 ranks, the player's maximum LP increases by one point. When the player reaches rank 300, their maximum LP will take 3 ranks to increase by one point instead of 2. Refilling the LP or leveling up will cause the LP to be overflowed, which means that players may sometimes end up with more LP than their account would normally be able to have. 
Gs: The app's in-game currency, Gs can be used for leveling up or idolizing an idol, or buying temporary stat increases during some events.
Friend points: Points that can be acquired by having other players help during a Live. Friend points can be used to scout N, SSR and R rarity cards.
Love Gems: The app's in-game currency which can be bought through in-app purchase. It is can be used for refilling the entire LP bar, member scouting (gacha pull), or continuing a failed Live.
Scouting Ticket: Besides Love Gems, the other way to scout a rare member through the "Honor Scouting" system is by using a scouting ticket. There are three types of tickets: green regular tickets, blue scouting coupons, and purchased scouting tickets that guarantee cards of a certain rarity.
Stickers: If an R, SR, SSR, or UR rarity card is used for practice or deleted, the player will gain a sticker. These stickers can be used for idolizing a card or purchasing other cards or scouting coupons from the Sticker Shop. Stickers' rarity are divided into 4 types that depend on the rarity of the used cards. Cards that doesn't feature the girls from either μ's or Aqours, and promotional and skill cards won't give stickers.

Cards and team formation
Players can form 9-person units. The girls in the formation are called "members". Players acquire new members by doing Lives or scouting through "Student Scouting" that uses the gacha system. Two same cards can be combined and they will be "Idolized," which unlocks new card art and a side story gives a Love Gem. Each member has their own card level and skill that can be leveled up by doing a "Practice", which involves sacrificing one or more cards to increase the level of another one. In order to increase skill level, cards that are "practiced" must have the same skill. Increasing skill and card levels improves the scores players can obtain in "Lives". New Aqours and regular members are added every time an in-game event has ended and μ's cards are added halfway through events.

Members cards are divided into 5 rarities: N (normal), R (rare), SR (super rare), SSR (special super rare), and UR (ultra rare). Each rarity (except N-rarity) has a different set of leader skills (passive) and active skills that affect the Lives scores. Cards and songs are divided into attributes that represent each card's idol type: Smile, Cool, and Pure. Using the same attribute members to do Lives of the same attribute song gives a higher score.

The original characters added in the game are featured in the N-rarity cards. There are 54 characters with 9 girls represent 6 different schools:

Seiran High School
Shizuku Ōsaka

Chitose Bridge High School

Shinonome Academy

Kanata Konoe

Touou Academy

Shion Girls' Academy

Y.G. International Academy

Emma Verde

These characters are not voiced, but Emma Verde (previously only named Emma), Kanata Konoe, and Shizuku Osaka were promoted to become part of the Nijigasaki High School Idol Club and were each given voice actresses. Fujimaru designed the new characters.

Besides the regular cards, the game also includes "promotional cards" and "skill up cards". Promotional cards can be obtained free as a bonus from purchasing Love Live! merchandise, clearing quests, purchasing through Sticker Shop, scouting using Gs, or simply logging in to the game. Regardless of rarity, promotional cards have relatively low stats and leader skill effects. They also don't give stickers when practiced or deleted. The cards are usually pre-idolized, which means that players cannot idolize the card for different art. μ's and Aqours' respective rival groups (A-Rise and Saint Snow), the groups' younger selves, and the girls from Nijigasaki High School are also featured as fully voiced promotional cards.

A skill up card is used to level up the skill of a card. It can't be idolized or used in a Live. These cards feature characters around the main groups such as the girls' mothers, school friends and teachers, and even animals. These cards can be obtained by logging in, special box scouting, in-game event rewards, or purchasing a limited time sale pack.

In-game events
Every 15 days, an in-game event with a total of 1 UR rarity card as a reward is held. Each event runs for around 10 days with a 5-days break. The UR rarity card is obtainable by collecting event points and competing with other players through event points ranking. Reward includes Gs, Love Gems, and skill-up cards.

The game has currently 6 type of events:

Players play an event-exclusive song to get the event points. The song requires Tokens which are collected by playing songs. Sometimes, the event also featured a short story that was previously featured in the franchise's novel series School Idol Diary.

4 players compete with each other to get the highest score from a randomly-chosen song.

Players can play up to three songs in a row and can use stat increases to improve their score and/or Live prize. Some stat increases will appear randomly from in-game friends.

Players can play up to 5 songs and receive the accumulated prize at the end of the challenge. μ's members will appear and give random ability increases. If 3 members with same sub-unit, school year, and/or wear same uniform appear, a specific mission will appear. Clearing the mission will give the players an additional prize.
 (Retired)
Players clear Live songs to unlock Aqours and μ's side stories and clear missions while "taking a stroll" around the event map. Live songs also give 'souvenirs' which players can exchange for friend points, event SR rarity cards, and in-game backgrounds.

Works like Score Match, but instead of competing against each other, the event requires 4 players to work together in clearing missions by reaching certain scores or combos. Players' scores are determined by how much they contributed. While in score mission they are ranked from highest to the lowest score, combo mission will always display anyone with "Full Combo" as the first place(s).

Collaboration event
In 2019, the Japanese server of School Idol Festival held its first collaboration event outside the Love Live! franchise. The collaboration event with mobile TCG, Shadowverse, was held in both of the games (September 20–30 within the School Idol Festival app). Between the 9 girls of Aqours, Yoshiko Tsushima was chosen as representative through fan votes. The collaboration campaign includes a new song, "Deep Resonance" that was included in the group's 4th single, collaboration SSR cards of the group, a limited UR card for Yoshiko, as well as login bonuses.

A Code Geass x School Idol Festival collaboration event was announced in March 2022 as a part of the game's 9th anniversary campaign. Event reward includes UR card Chika Takami in Ashford Academy uniform.

Service termination 
On January 31, 2023, SIF Japanese server, Worldwide server, and Simplified Chinese server officially announced to terminate the game service on March 31, 2023.

Love Live! School Idol Festival 2: Miracle Live! 

The successor to School Idol Festival was announced at the franchise's 2022 thanksgiving festival. Along with previous groups—μ's, Aqours, and Nijigasaki High School Idol Club—Liella! will also make their appearance. The global version is also under development. Players will be able to transfer their game data in LLSIF to SIF2. The data transfer will retain players' obtained cards in an album feature.

Besides the main groups, songs from A-RISE, Saint Snow, Sunny Passion, Wien Margarete, as well as upcoming songs from Hasunosora Girls School Idol Club and School Idol Musical will also be included.

The rhythm gameplay from the previous game will be back with a renewed UI. New features include a  character/group chat system, in which a player can unlock conversations by deepening their bond with characters.

The game is scheduled to release in Spring 2023.

Love Live! School Idol Festival: After School Activity

On November 27, 2015, the official website of the game announced the production of the arcade version of Love Live! School Idol Festival. The arcade game titled  (often abbreviated as SIFAC or Sukufesu AC) is a joint development with Square Enix and operates using NESiCA Cards. The name comes from the fact that because the initial release of the game was an arcade game, players will have to go to a game center to play the game, which gives it an "after school" feeling. A beta testing on location were held on May 13–15 and May 27–29, 2016. The game was fully released on December 6 of the same year.

Different from the mobile game, the arcade version featured a cooperative mode; it can be played by up to 3 players in certain modes and has fully 3D CG dances for all songs. It also lets players collect and print Profile Cards and Member Cards—each comes with buff skills—just like the original game.

In October 2017, Aqours from Love Live! Sunshine!! were announced to join the arcade game. They first appeared for a limited time from December 6, 2017, until January 8, 2018, as a preliminary trial as part of the game's 1st anniversary campaign.

In April 2018, Square Enix announced the game will receive a major update titled Love Live! School Idol Festival: After School Activity Next Stage as part of Love Live! School Idol Festivals 5th anniversary campaign. Aqours' songs were added as well as a new function named  and a new song difficulty. The group has been officially added to the game along with the major update on December 6, 2018. On September 5, 2019, Saint Snow, the rival duo of Aqours, was added to the game, along with several of their songs.

Square Enix announced in October 2020 that the arcade version will receive a final update on November 10, 2020, essentially ending support for the game's arcade iteration. However, a 4th anniversary "Thank You" promotional campaign was held from December 2020 to March 2021. The game service for the arcade version ended on October 1, 2021.

The arcade version has been ported to PlayStation 4 under the title  released digitally in North America, Japan, and Southeast Asia on March 24, 2021.

 Gameplay 

The gameplay is similar to its mobile counterpart, however the arcade version uses nine physical buttons placed around the display panel instead of touchscreen. The main difference from the mobile game is there's no stamina system, so players cannot fail any songs. However, in order to reach higher score and ranking, the player must hit all nine "Finale Rhythm Icons", which is a note with a star, anchor, or snowman (μ's, Aqours, and Saint Snow modes respectively). Each Final Rhythm Icon will add letters to a gauge which would spell out "Love Live!", if all nine are collected. When all nine are collected, the Finale Mode begins, usually at the song's outro, where all notes will yield extra score points.
The difficulty levels are different from mobile game to accommodate with physical buttons. The highest difficulty level, "Challenge," requires players to press up to four buttons at once.

The arcade version has separate card printing machine, where players can collect Member Cards, and create their own Profile Card. The Member Cards are collected through a gacha-style system. A Member Card comes in two varieties, each with different rarities, R and HR. An R card unlocks the costume set, while an HR card also adds additional effects, like "Finale Focus" (introduced in the Next Stage update). Player's Profile Cards are created by taking a screenshot of the desired member in music videos, and adding up to three Skill Cards. These cards can be printed out and shared with other players to assist their gameplay.

PlayStation 4 version
On October 10, 2020, a console port of the arcade game was announced, titled Love Live! School Idol Festival: After School Activity Wai-Wai! Home Meeting!! (officially abbreviated as SIFAC HM). It was released in North America, Japan, and Southeast Asia on March 24, 2021, for PlayStation 4. The game also features English, simplified and traditional Chinese localisations, similar to other games in the franchise. SIFAC HM received exclusive content not featured in the arcade version. The game is natively backward compatible with PlayStation 5.

SIFAC HM is free-to-start, which the base game includes eight songs. Additional songs are available as paid downloadable content (DLC). At the release, 21 Song Pack DLCs (13 for μ's, and 9 for Aqours / Saint Snow; 117 songs in total) became available.

Unlike the arcade version, SIFAC HM has its own difficulty levels to accommodate for DualShock 4 and DualSense controllers. From easiest to hardest, "Beginner" and "Standard" are played with 4 buttons, while "Hyper" and "Adventure" are played with 6 buttons. Arcade mode with 9 buttons, with all its original difficulty levels, is also available.

Another difference from the arcade version is the player can unlock the costume set by "creating" it, using materials received from playing Live Shows. Alternatively the player can also purchase the costume sets as DLC immediately.

Technical issues
An infamous bug occurred in the first day after the Next Stage update had been released for the arcades in 2018, wherein sometimes the characters appeared to be naked during the dance sequences. This bug was widely shared on Twitter as screenshots and clips of dancing "Barbie doll-esque" nude characters during gameplay had been spread across it. This bug caused Square Enix to take the game server in "urgent maintenance" for few days in order to fix the bug.

Love Live! School Idol Festival All Stars

A spin-off game of Love Live! School Idol Festival was announced during Tokyo Game Show 2017 as part of the game's 4th anniversary. The new game titled  (officially abbreviated as ) for 2019 release. The game uses an alternate story that differentiates it from other media where μ's and Aqours are in the same school year and works together as one along with the girls from Nijigasaki High School Idol Club. Owing to this, μ's isn't disbanded, and Chika Takami's original reason for becoming school idol in the anime and earlier sources, which was after seeing μ's on stage, was slightly changed to admiring school idols and then become one herself. The game is described as "the ultimate idol rhythm RPG game" that allows players to 'participate' in the game and customize the school idols. Nijigasaki High School Idol Club performs the opening theme titled "Tokimeki Runners." The game was officially released in Japan on September 26, 2019. A global version which features English, Korean, Traditional Chinese, and Thai languages was released on February 25, 2020. The mainland China server with Simplified Chinese was released on May 28, 2021.

Players assume the role of the protagonist, a 2nd year student at Nijigasaki High School who becomes interested in school idols after seeing joint live between μ's and Aqours. After looking for a related club in Nijigasaki, the protagonist learns that the existing school idol club is on its last legs of survival and decides to rebuild and reform the school idol club.

New features include: tree-based growth system, new Live system, and  system. At launch, players could link both games under the same SIF ID account. Syncing their SIF ID created on Love Live! School Idol Festival with LLAS, players were able to port their Rank and their progress made in the game to the new title. Benefits of the new ID offer extended far beyond saving player progress,  as player rewards could be obtained until February 2022. As announced through in-game news releases, SIF ID player links ended in April 2022.

In August 2020, a character that appeared within the game's story, Shioriko Mifune, was added to the game as a playable character and Nijigasaki High School Idol Club as an official member. She received a solo song, a 3D model, and cards obtainable within the games scouting boxes. More new members, Lanzhu Zhong and Mia Taylor, were added as playable characters in September 2021.

On December 23, 2021, in a news release in-game, it was announced that the development and operational rights of School Idol Festival All Stars will be moved from KLab Inc. to MyNet Games Inc., while Bushiroad will manage its publishing rights of the game, effective January 6, 2022.

Live Show system

Instead of focusing on its "rhythm game" system, the game uses an "RPG-like system" where it requires the player to carefully build their teams with strategy and train their idols in order to be able to successfully clear a live, as all tapped notes will drain the Stamina bar, even when tapped perfectly. The 9 tap note icons that represent the 9 members of an idol group have been reduced to two, and the player is able to tap anywhere on the screen to register a tap. During a Live Show, the participating member(s) are depicted as full-3D models with dance choreography on screen.

In addition to the original members' elements (Smile, Pure, Cool), 3 new elements have been added: Active, Natural, and Elegant. Besides elements, the members are also divided by 4 different attributes: Voltage (Vo), Special Skill (Sp), Guard (Gd), and Skill (Sk). During the lives, 9 members are divided into 3 "Strategy" units. Strategy units can have different positive and negative effects depending on the members' attributes in the Strategy, such as increased tap score, reduced stamina damage, or more frequent skill activation, as well shortened Strategy switch time. Only one of the Strategies is active at a time, but the player may switch to a different Strategy to take advantage of different members' skills and effects and to clear "Appeal Chances" that appear during a live.

The player can also put the Live Show in autoplay, where the notes will be tapped automatically, allows player to focus on controlling the Strategy units completely. However, all tapped note timings are "Great," which gains less total Voltage compared to manual play. Achieving S rank in a song difficulty allows player to use Skip Tickets, where player can clear the cleared song without having to actually play the same song's difficulty.

 Event system 
Besides the two types of event that also featured in School Idol Festival, there are some type of new event exclusive to All Stars:

 SBL (SIFAS Big Live): A big event where 20 people play at the same time and work together to reach the goal that the event has set. With the rewards obtained from the event, player is able to acquire the event cards from the previous events, scout tickets, and others.
 Dream Live Parade: Player needs to clear one stage to move onto the next stage with one limitation: they can only use one card for one time (except for featured characters, which is two). Player is able to obtain coins that allows them to exchange the coins with accessories and others.

Systems
Aside from the new live and event system, the game also introduced some new systems:

 Practice system: To rise an idol's stats or "Idolizing" them, the player has to acquire needed items through performing Live Shows, Training, or event rewards. Through Practice's skill Bond Board, player are also able to unlock the idols' costumes (as well as the re-colored version), side stories, "Inspiration" skills, and navigation voices that is listenable in the front page. The idol's skill tree can also be unlocked further more by acquiring the idol's card's duplicate through "Scouting," event rewards for event-exclusive cards, or using the "School Idol Radiance."
 Training: Player can create a team of 9 cards and send them to a "Training Camp." The training camp requires an Action Point (AP) and gives items for skill tree advancement due completion. The APs will replenish up to 3 every 12am and 12pm JST. For certain chances, idols that came to the training camp can get "Inspiration Skills". Depending on the card's rarity, up to 3 Inspiration Skill slot has been unlocked by default, and one more slot can be unlocked through Practice.
 Bonding system: The player is able to boost the idol's stats through the Bonding system. The boosts are applied to all cards of the same idol, not per card. This section is divided in two parts, as the latter was added in later update:Bond Level: As the player clears (or skips) Live Shows with idols in their Formation, the idols receive certain amount of their "Bond Points," depending on the difficulty. When reaching certain number of Bond Points they can reach a new Bond Level, which gives more stats boost to their cards, and will be able to unlock Bond Boards as detailed below. It will also unlock their "Bond Episode," which some is required to unlock certain songs. However, their Bond Level is initially capped at Level 15 at the beginning, but their cap will increase by up to two for each new cards, and Limit Increases (receiving duplicate cards, and using Radiances in Practice).Bond Board: As the player levels up the idol's Bond Level, the player is able to unlock Bond Boards. Their idol stats can be boosted further through Bond Board, using their "Memorial Pieces" and "Memento Pieces." A single Board consists of five boost panels, with three of them are always Appeal, Technique, and Stamina each, while the other two varies for each Board. Completing the board will proceed to the next unlocked Board sequentially, and gives the idol additional bonus. The material cost for each panel becomes higher in higher level Boards. This Bond Board feature was added since version 1.7.0 in both servers.Costume system: Player is able to change a character's 3D model costume, where it will affect them in main menu, bond menu, and live shows. These purely cosmetic costumes are obtainable through UR and SR cards within their Bond Board or by exchanging the costume tickets.

 Nijigasaki High School Idol Club 

In March 2017, the official website of Love Live School Idol Festival launched a new project called "Perfect Dream Project," which features 9 new girls. Emma, Kanata Konoe, and Shizuku Osaka were three members who were already featured as N-rarity girls and topped the 3rd popularity poll. The remaining 6 girls were later introduced: Ayumu Uehara, Kasumi Nakasu, Karin Asaka, Ai Miyashita, Setsuna Yuki, and Rina Tennoji. In August 2020, a new member, Shioriko Mifune was added. In September 2021, Lanzhu Zhong and Mia Taylor were also added.

The members are part of the school idol club at Nijigasaki High School that is located in Odaiba, Tokyo. The school is popular due to its free school style and diverse majors. Unlike μ's and Aqours, they are not a group, but rather individual school idols who compete with each other; Until 2019, a popularity poll was held every month to determine their rank. Together, they are referred as —shortened as Nijigaku or simply Nijigasaki in the official sources. The girls were split up into groups of three to begin activities in three different apps before their addition to the game: Dengeki Online website (Kasumi, Karin, Setsuna), Famitsu App website (Ayumu, Ai, Rina), and the game's official website (Emma, Shizuku, Kanata). Each place is working as a separate room or branch office for the Nijigasaki High School.

They are featured in the spin-off game Love Live! School Idol Festival All Stars along with μ's and Aqours. They also appear as SR rarity cards in Love Live! School Idol Festival. Each member also got a solo song that was released along with the group's theme song for the new game on November 21, 2018. Their second album, containing more solo songs, was released on October 2, 2019. The third album that also includes Shioriko's first solo single was released on September 2, 2020. The fourth album includes solo songs for the original 9 members, as well as solo songs for the three newly added members. It was released on October 13, 2021.

The names of the girls' sub-units were decided by community polls. Rather than three sub-units of three members like μ's and Aqours, the Nijigasaki girls were divided into a duo, trio, and a quartet. The sub-unit formations and naming were announced on June 10, 2019. The formations are: Karin-Ai (DiverDiva), Ayumu-Shizuku-Setsuna''' (A・Zu・Na), and Kasumi-Kanata-Emma-Rina (Qu4rtz, pronounced "Quartz"). The sub-unit's first singles were released February 12, 2020. A new sub-unit was later announced in July 2021. It consists of Shioriko Mifune, Lanzhu Zhong, and Mia Taylor. The sub-unit's name was later announced as R3birth. Their first single was released on October 6, 2021.

An anime adaptation titled  started broadcast in October 2020. The anime features a slightly different storyline from the game, original protagonist character Yu Takasaki, as well as cameos from School Idol Festival N-rarity girls who did not make it into the "Perfect Dream Project." A second season premiered in April 2022, with the three new members that were added to the game—Shioriko Mifune, Mia Taylor, and Lanzhu Zhong— making their appearance.

Other media

 Discography 

CDs and albums released as part of campaign from the game franchise. Note that since Nijigasaki High School Idol Club were created for School Idol Festival All Stars, any music releases not tied for the game is not included.

Print
Several books of the game's illustration cards and original story collection has been released since 2013.

Manga
A 4-koma manga was published and can be read via the game's application titled . The manga tells the stories around the N-rarity girls. It was published from September 30, 2016, every Friday and ended on 54th episode.

After the announcement of "Perfect Dream Project," three 4-koma mangas are published respectively via Love Live! School Idol Festival All Stars , Dengeki Online, and Famitsu App official website as part of their school idol club activity. The first manga titled  is focused on the N rarity members who topped the popularity poll: Shizuku Ōsaka, Kanata Konoe, and Emma Verde. Second 4-koma manga focused on Kasumi Nakasu, Karin Asaka, and Setsuna Yūki since July 4, 2017. The manga is drawn by Miyakohito. Third 4-koma manga focused on Ayumu Uehara, Ai Miyashita, and Rina Tennōji also published since October 3, 2017. Choboraunyopomi drawn the manga.

Reception
, the game has reached over 40 million users worldwide (Japanese and Global server combined). This exclude multiple accounts on same devices.

, the global server of Love Live! School Idol Festival All Stars has reached over 1 million players.

 In popular culture 
The voice clips "I'm so happy!" and "I'm so sad" by Mari Ohara from Love Live! School Idol Festival All Stars became a trending on a video sharing platform TikTok in October 2021.

Controversy
Fans of the English version of the Love Live! School Idol Festival'' game discovered that most of the homosexual subtext between the various girls depicted in the game was removed. In some instances, overt references to relationships between girls were changed to imply a relationship between a girl and a boy. KLab has since issued a statement on the controversy and later released an update on June 30, 2015, to make adjustments to the translated text to retain their original meanings.

Notes

References

External links
  
 School Idol Festival 2 official website 
 
 
 
 Mainland Chinese server website

2013 video games
Android (operating system) games
Arcade video games
Bushiroad
Free-to-play video games
LGBT-related controversies in video games
Gacha games
High school-themed video games
IOS games
Music video games
Lantis (company)
Love Live!
PlayStation 4 games
Rhythm games
Sunrise (company)
Square Enix games
Video games based on animated television series
Video games developed in Japan
Video games with cel-shaded animation
Video games with downloadable content